Nancy Lou Marchand (June 19, 1928 – June 18, 2000) was an American actress. She began her career in theatre in 1951. She was most famous for her television portrayals of Margaret Pynchon on Lou Grant and Livia Soprano on The Sopranos.

Early life
Marchand was born in Buffalo, New York, to Raymond L. Marchand, a dentist, and his wife, Marjorie Freeman Marchand, a pianist. She was raised Methodist. She graduated from the Carnegie Institute of Technology (now Carnegie Mellon University) in 1949. She studied theatre at the Herbert Berghof Studio in New York City.

Career
An accomplished member of the Actors Studio, Marchand made her Broadway debut in The Taming of the Shrew in 1951. Additional theatre credits include The Merchant of Venice, Love's Labour's Lost, Much Ado About Nothing, Forty Carats, And Miss Reardon Drinks A Little, The Plough and the Stars, The Glass Menagerie, Morning's at Seven, Awake and Sing!, The Octette Bridge Club, Love Letters, Man and Superman, The Importance of Being Earnest, The School for Scandal, The Balcony, for which she won a Distinguished Performance Obie Award, and Black Comedy/White Liars, for which she was nominated for the Tony Award for Best Performance by a Leading Actress in a Play. She was nominated four times for the Drama Desk Award, winning handily for Mornings at Seven. She won a second Obie for her performance in A. R. Gurney's The Cocktail Hour.

On daytime television, Marchand originated the roles of Vinnie Phillips on the CBS soap opera, Love of Life and Theresa Lamonte on the NBC soap, Another World. She also memorably starred as matriarch Edith Cushing on Lovers and Friends, a short-lived soap opera.

On primetime television, Marchand was renowned for her roles as patrician newspaper publisher Margaret Pynchon on Lou Grant—winning four Emmy Awards as Best Supporting Actress in a Dramatic Series for her performance—and matriarch Livia Soprano, mother of Tony Soprano, on the HBO series The Sopranos, which earned her a Golden Globe Award for Best Performance by an Actress in a Supporting Role in a Series, Mini-Series or Motion Picture Made for Television and a Screen Actors Guild Award for Outstanding Performance by an Ensemble in a Drama Series, as well as an Emmy Award nomination for Best Supporting Actress in a Dramatic Series.

She appeared in many anthology series in the early days of television, including The Philco Television Playhouse (on which she starred in Marty opposite Rod Steiger), Kraft Television Theatre, Studio One, and Playhouse 90. Additional television credits include The Law and Mr. Jones, Spenser: For Hire, Law & Order, Homicide: Life on the Street, Coach, and Night Court. She played Hester Crane, mother of Frasier Crane, on an episode of Cheers.

Marchand's feature film credits include The Bachelor Party (1957), Ladybug Ladybug, Me, Natalie, Tell Me That You Love Me, Junie Moon, The Hospital, The Bostonians, Jefferson in Paris, Brain Donors, Reckless, The Naked Gun, Sabrina, Dear God, and From the Hip (1987).

Personal life and death
Marchand was married to actor Paul Sparer. He died in 1999 from cancer at age 75. The couple had three children: Katie, David, and Rachel. 

Marchand suffered from lung cancer, emphysema, and COPD.  She died on June 18, 2000, a day before her 72nd birthday, in Stratford, Connecticut. 

She was posthumously inducted into the American Theatre Hall of Fame.

Filmography

Film

Television

Awards and nominations

References

External links

1928 births
2000 deaths
Actresses from Buffalo, New York
American film actresses
American musical theatre actresses
American television actresses
Best Supporting Actress Golden Globe (television) winners
Deaths from emphysema
Deaths from lung cancer in Connecticut
Obie Award recipients
Outstanding Performance by a Supporting Actress in a Drama Series Primetime Emmy Award winners
20th-century American actresses
20th-century American singers
Carnegie Mellon University College of Fine Arts alumni
20th-century American women singers